NGC 4651 is a spiral galaxy located in the constellation of Coma Berenices that can be seen with amateur telescopes, at a distance not well determined that ranges from 35 million light years to 72 million light years.

Features 
This member of the Virgo Cluster, located on its outskirts, is known as the Umbrella Galaxy due to the umbrella-shaped structure that extends from its disk to the east and that is composed of stellar streams, being the remnants of a much smaller galaxy that has been torn apart by NGC 4651's tidal forces, something that explains why NGC 4651 has been included on Halton Arp's Atlas of Peculiar Galaxies as Arp 189 -galaxy with filaments-.

Studies using radiotelescopes of the distribution of its neutral hydrogen show distortions on NGC 4651's outer regions and a gas clump associated with a dwarf galaxy that may have born in the event that produced the mentioned stellar streams.

Unlike most spiral galaxies of the Virgo Cluster, NGC 4651 is rich in neutral hydrogen, also extending beyond the optical disk, and its star formation is typical for a galaxy of its type.

References

External links
 

Unbarred spiral galaxies
Coma Berenices
189
4651
42833
7901
Virgo Cluster